Jalen Devonn Williams (born April 14, 2001) is an American professional basketball player for the Oklahoma City Thunder of the National Basketball Association (NBA). He played college basketball for the Santa Clara Broncos.

High school career
Williams played basketball for Perry High School in Gilbert, Arizona.  Williams grew 8 inches from his sophomore to senior year of high school. Williams committed to played college basketball for Santa Clara in 2018.

College career
As a freshman at Santa Clara, Williams averaged 8 points, 3 rebounds, 2 assists, and 1 steal. As a sophomore, Williams took a step forward averaging 12 points and 4 rebounds and became a WCC All-Conference Honorable Mention. In Williams' junior year, he was named First-team All-WCC (2022) and to the NABC All-District (9) Second Team. He averaged 18 points, 4.4 rebounds, and 4.2 assists per game. On April 28, 2022, Williams announced his decision to declare for the 2022 NBA Draft.

Professional career

Oklahoma City Thunder (2022–present) 
Williams was selected with the 12th overall pick by the Oklahoma City Thunder in the 2022 NBA draft. On March 5, 2023, Williams scored a career-high 32 points on 12-15 shooting in a 129-119 win against the Utah Jazz.

Personal life
Williams family moved to Arizona when he was seven years old. He had a 8-inch growth spurt from his sophomore to senior year of high school.

Williams younger brother Cody is a 5 star prospect who is committed to play for Colorado.

References

External links
Santa Clara Broncos bio

2001 births
Living people
American men's basketball players
Basketball players from Denver
Oklahoma City Thunder draft picks
Oklahoma City Thunder players
Santa Clara Broncos men's basketball players
Shooting guards